A Motor Launch (ML) is a small military vessel in Royal Navy service. It was designed for harbour defence and submarine chasing or for armed high-speed air-sea rescue.  Some vessels for water police service are also known as motor launches.

World War I service

Although small by naval standards, it was larger than the preceding steam or diesel-engined harbour launches of 56ft and coastal motor boats of 40 and 55 ft length. The first motor launches entered service in the First World War. These were five hundred and eighty  vessels built by the US Elco company for the Admiralty, receiving the numbers ML-1 to ML-580. They served with the Royal Navy between 1916 and the end of the war, defending the British coast from German submarines. Some of the earliest examples, including ML 1, also served in the Persian Gulf from June 1916. After the Armistice of 11 November 1918 a flotilla of 12 Royal Navy motor launches travelled down the Rhine performing duty as the Rhine Patrol Flotilla. The only known surviving example of a World War I era motor launch is ML-286, which now lies in a poor condition on the banks of the River Thames.

World War II types

The BPBC Type Two was succeeded by the Type Three 68 ft "Hants and Dorset".

Post-war, many motor launches were taken on as pleasure boats. A number of them are on the National Register of Historic Vessels.

See also

 Harbour launch
 High-speed launch
 Motor gunboat
 Motor torpedo boat
 Coastal Forces of the Royal Navy
 R boat – German World War II equivalent

References

 Gardiner, Robert, Conway's All the World's Fighting Ships 1906–1921 Conway Maritime Press, 1985. .
 Gardiner, Robert and Chesneau, Roger, Conway's All the World's Fighting Ships 1922–1946, Conway Maritime Press, 1980. .

External links
 UK National Register of Historic Vessels
 Naval Museum of Manitoba
 Juno Beach
 A Short History of HMS St Christopher. Royal Navy Coastal Forces training base, mainly for MLs
 Stoker Harold Siddall Royal Navy, his service in ML.1030 and capture in Crete 1941
 "The Movies" A Motor Launch History

Ships of the Royal Navy
Submarine chaser classes
Patrol boat classes
Auxiliary search and rescue ship classes
Military boats